Digov (also, Digov-Dara, Digovdere, and Dygov-Dara) is a village in the Lerik Rayon of Azerbaijan.  The village forms part of the municipality of Mistan.

References 

Populated places in Lerik District